Loes Markerink (born 14 December 1985 in Delfzijl) is a road cyclist from the Netherlands. She won at the 2003 UCI Road World Championships the junior women's road race and finished second in the women's junior time trial. As a senior, she has won a stage in several stage races: Tour de Bretagne, Damesronde van Drenthe, Grande Boucle Féminine Internationale, Holland Ladies Tour and Gracia–Orlová.

See also
 2008 Team Flexpoint season

References

External links
 
 
 
 

1985 births
Living people
Dutch female cyclists
UCI Road World Championships cyclists for the Netherlands
People from Delfzijl
Cyclists from Groningen (province)
21st-century Dutch women